Ashaga-Yarak is a rural locality (a selo) and the administrative centre of Ashaga-Yaraksky Selsoviet, Khivsky District, Republic of Dagestan, Russia. The population was 1,329 as of 2010. There are 11 streets.

Geography 
Ashaga-Yarak is located 14 km north of Khiv (the district's administrative centre) by road. Yukhari-Yarak is the nearest rural locality.

References 

Rural localities in Khivsky District